Cameron Pennyfeather (born 10 February 1998) is a Kittitian cricketer. He made his List A debut for the UWI Vice Chancellor's XI against England on 25 February 2017.

References

External links
 

1998 births
Living people
Kittitian cricketers
Place of birth missing (living people)